The Nashua Silver Knights is a collegiate summer baseball team based in Nashua, New Hampshire. It is a charter member of the Futures Collegiate Baseball League (FCBL), a wood-bat league with a 64-game regular season comprising eight teams ranging from New Hampshire to western Connecticut. The team's home games are played at Holman Stadium in Nashua. The team is owned by John Creedon Jr, who also owns the Worcester Bravehearts.

The Silver Knights are one of the seven FCBL teams playing in a stadium that used to host professional baseball. The Silver Knights have won the FCBL Championship in five of the league's eleven years of existence and have qualified for the post-season every year, except for 2021. They are the last survivor of the original four FCBL teams.

Ownership
The Silver Knights were a charter team of the FCBL, as Drew Weber, former owner of the Lowell Spinners, wanted to also operate a franchise in the New England Collegiate Baseball League.  When this was not feasible, Weber and others created the FCBL.  Chris Hall, who had been the General Manager of professional and collegiate teams in Nashua, became the league's commissioner.

The name Knights was chosen over three other club nominations by a vote of Nashua grade-school students.  The club modified the winner to "Silver Knights" to avoid conflict with an existing amateur baseball team in the city.

In March 2019 the team was sold to John Creedon Jr, owner of the Worcester Bravehearts.

Results
2011
Mike Chambers was the first field manager, with B.J. Neverett and Tom Bowles assisting as coaches. The Silver Knights finished first in the regular season, with a 27-16 record. They defeated the Torrington Titans (25-17) in a best-of-three championship series. The Silver Knights drew an average of 869 spectators per game, far above initial expectations of 300-500 fans.

2012
The league expanded from four to nine teams. Neverett was promoted to field manager, with Bowles and J.P. Pyne assisting as coaches. The Silver Knights dominated the regular season with a 39-13 record.  Then they swept through the Brockton Rox and North Shore Navigators to win their second consecutive FCBL Championship. PerfectGame.org named them the 26th best team in all of collegiate summer league baseball.

2013
Neverett was promoted to the front office as VP of Player Development. Pyne was promoted to field manager, with Bowles assisting as pitching coach. The regular-season record of 34-19 was one game behind the Martha's Vineyard Sharks (35-18). Both teams thus earned a bye from the "one-game play-in" instituted that year for the next-best four teams, and both teams won their best-of-three semifinal series in two games.  But Martha's Vineyard, which had won 6 of the 7 regular-season contests against Nashua, won both games of the championship series.

2014
Ted Currle was hired as their field manager, with Jeff Dupont and Kyle Jackson assisting as coaches. Currle had managed the Martha's Vineyard Sharks in 2011 and was an assistant coach for the Brockton Rox in 2012 and 2013.  The team spent most of the season around .500 and was one of four teams with similar records headed for the one-game play-in to the post-season.  On August 8, the last day of the regular season, Nashua lost the right to host this play-in game, finishing the regular season at 28-26.  Traveling to Torrington, Connecticut the next day, Nashua lost the play-in game in 11 innings.

2015
With the replacement of the Old Orchard Beach franchise by the Bristol Blues, Nashua moved to the East Division, joining in-state rival Seacoast Mavericks. The FCBL expanded the playoff format, allowing 8 of the 10 teams into the post-season but making the first two rounds a single game. The Silver Knights finished with a regular-season record of 28-28, fourth in the dominant East Division. They won the first-round playoff game at North Shore, but lost the second-round game the next day at Bristol. After the season, Drew Weber announced his intention to sell both the Silver Knights and the Spinners as a package.

2016
The FCBL returned to the 2014 format, in which only 6 of the 10 teams qualified for the post-season. B.J. Neverett moved out of the front office and back to the field as the team's manager and took the franchise to the FCBL championship. The Silver Knights dominated the East Division early, but eventually fell 2½ games behind Seacoast for the division title with a regular-season record of 34-21. This earned them the right to host the play-in game with Torrington, but the Silver Knights were seeded lower than their subsequent two opponents, each of which elected to start its best-of-three series at Nashua. Seacoast took the semifinal series to a full three games, each won by the visiting team. The Silver Knights won both games of the championship series against Worcester, now coached by J.P. Pyne.

Weber succeeded in selling the Spinners and took the Silver Knights off the market. Neverett's brother Tim became a radio broadcaster for the Boston Red Sox, and Silver Knights results were occasionally mentioned during those broadcasts. Tim's son Matt Neverett was one of the announcers of Silver Knights games on WSMN radio.

2017
The Silver Nights were one of several teams playing around the .500 mark. They finished the season at .491, an identical record to the Pittsfield Suns, which won the fourth seed and the right to host the one-game play-in game against Nashua on August 8 through the tie-breaker, a superior record against the other playoff teams. Fifth-seeded Nashua won the play-in game and swept the semifinals. The other finalist was the sixth-seeded Worcester Bravehearts, as all six playoff games in the first two rounds went to the lower-seeded team. Nashua elected to start the series at Worcester and won away and at home, repeating on August 12 as FCBL Champions. Cam Cook won the regular season batting title with an average of .397, he also broke the single season record for hits with 81. Ryan Sullivan won the MVP award for the Championship series.

2018
In the off-season, both General Manager Ronnie Wallace and Assistant GM Cheryl Lindner resigned within days of one another to take jobs outside baseball. Rick Muntean, a former General Manager of the Bristol Blues, was recruited as the new GM in Nashua. Manager B.J. Neverett took advantage of a liberalized FCBL rule allowing up to 5 "commits" (high-school graduates intending to play college baseball in the coming year), resulting in a distinctly younger team. A month into the season, the club signed power hitters who had excelled on nearby teams in the previous season, but the results were mixed. The league dropped from 9 to 7 teams, but the playoff rules continued to extend to the best 6. Nashua dropped out of contention, then surged in the last week to become the fifth seed. It lost the play-in game at Brockton.

2019
The FCBL started 2019 as a seven-team league again, as a new Westfield franchise balanced the defection of Martha's Vineyard to the NECBL. As the Seacoast Mavericks remained on hiatus, Nashua became the last of the four charter teams. Owner Drew Weber sold a minority stake to local businessmen and fired Muntean, appointing as co-General Managers team accountant Victoria Cookson and former mayoral candidate Michael Broderick. However, in March, Weber and the co-owners announced the sale of the club to John Creedon Jr., the owner of the Worcester Bravehearts. Creedon named Dave Pahucki the general manager in place of Weber's selections.

2020
The Futures League was one of the few leagues to play in the COVID-19 stricken summer. Playing a shortened season of 39 games, the Silver Knights went 23-16, finishing in 2nd place, 0.5 games behind the Worcester Bravehearts. The Silver Knights squared off against the Bravehearts in the championship for the third time in league history. After dropping game 1, the Silver Knights won games 2 and 3 to win their league leading 5th FCBL championship. Kyle Bouchard took home the MVP trophy.

Season results and attendance

 * The -1 reflects one loss in a "Home Run Derby", treated as half a win.  The .491 is the "points percentage" (see the FCBL article).  The Pittsfield Suns had the same regular-season record, but owned the tie-breaker and hosted the single play-in game as the 4th seed.

Post-season appearances

 *The FCBL changed its postseason to a two-round format starting in the 2012 season.
 ** A one-game play-in round was added in the 2013 season and was discontinued in 2020.

Managers

Awards

Team records 
Single season

Career

 * Futures Collegiate Baseball League record

Alumni in professional baseball

See also
 Futures Collegiate Baseball League
 Collegiate summer baseball

References

External links
FCBL website
Nashua Silver Knights website

Futures Collegiate Baseball League teams
Amateur baseball teams in New Hampshire
Sports in Nashua, New Hampshire
Baseball teams established in 2011

2011 establishments in New Hampshire